Freek Heerkens (born 13 September 1989 in Heeswijk-Dinther) is a Dutch professional footballer who plays as a centre back for Eerste Divisie club Willem II.

Honours
Willem II
Eerste Divisie: 2013–14

External links
 
 Career stats & Profile - Voetbal International

1989 births
Living people
People from Bernheze
Association football central defenders
Dutch footballers
Go Ahead Eagles players
Willem II (football club) players
Eredivisie players
Eerste Divisie players
Footballers from North Brabant